Troy Robertson (born July 30, 1961) is an American photographer and reality television star best known for competing on Survivor: One World, the 24th season of Survivor. On the show, he was known by his nickname, Troyzan. He would later return to Survivor for its 34th season, Survivor: Game Changers.

Early life and career
Robertson was born in Ellensburg, Washington, a small town in Kittitas County, and grew up spending his childhood in eastern Washington State. He attended Central Valley High School in Spokane, during which time he began developing a life-long interest in photography. He bought his first camera at the age of 17, and soon he became a self-taught photographer.

After high school, Robertson briefly attended Western Washington University to study The Arts. In 1983, he travelled to Guatemala to photograph the native tribes living in the rain forest. Soon after, he began a career as a model, living in Europe while travelling all over the world on assignments. In the early 1990's, he was living in Barcelona, but moved to Miami, Florida, to resume his photography career.

Robertson's photography has been featured in such publications as Sports Illustrated. Much of his work has ended up in the magazine's annual swimsuit issue, for which he has photographed such swimsuit models as Kate Upton, Chrissy Teigen, Brooklyn Decker, Bar Refaeli, and Nina Agdal.

Survivor
In 2012, Robertson was one of 18 castaways who competed on Survivor: One World, the 24th season of the American reality TV series Survivor. Three years later, he was one of the finalists in the fan vote which would decide the cast of Survivor: Cambodia; he was ultimately not chosen. In 2017, he finally returned to Survivor for its 34th season, Survivor: Game Changers.

One World

On his first season of Survivor, Robertson, known as "Troyzan" to his fellow castaways, began the game on Manono, an all-male tribe competing against Salani, the all-female tribe. HIs first alliance in the game was with Colton Cumbie, Leif Manson, Jonas Otsuji, and the similarly-nicknamed Greg "Tarzan" Smith. At the tribal swap, Robertson was switched to the Salani tribe, along with tribemates Jay Byars and Michael Jefferson. While on Salani, Robertson made a new alliance with Byars, Chelsea Meissner, and Kim Spradlin. On Night 17, both tribes merged.

In the first individual immunity challenge of the season, Robertson won immunity. At that night's Tribal Council, he voted with his post-swap alliance to eliminate Otsuji. Knowing that the women now had the numbers advantage, the men considered voting out Christina Cha next. However, Spradlin lied to Robertson about Jefferson wanting him gone, so Robertson voted with the women to eliminate Jefferson.

By Day 25, Robertson had become suspicious of Spradlin, so that night, fearing that the women were going to oust him next, he played a Hidden Immunity Idol he had found, negating two votes against him. But Byers was eliminated with five votes, making Robertson's idol play moot. On Day 27, Robertson again won individual immunity, after which he celebrated his victory by exclaiming, "This is MY island!" But on Day 30, he failed to win immunity again, and at that night's Tribal Council, he was voted out in eighth place as the eleventh person eliminated from the season, making him the fifth member of the jury.

At the Final Tribal Council, in the jury vote to decide who would win Sole Survivor, Robertson voted for Sabrina Thompson, who beat Meissner, but lost to Spradlin, in a 7–2–0 vote.

Game Changers

In his return to Survivor, Robertson started the game on the Mana Tribe. At the tribal swap on Day Seven, he was switched to Tavua, a brand new tribe on which he was the only original Mana member. While on Tavua, he found a clue to the Hidden Immunity Idol, and he managed to find it when no one was looking. Tavua dominated the next few challenges, but he was switched back to Mana after the second tribe switch. On the new Mana tribe, he aligned with Brad Culpepper, whose wife Monica Culpepper had competed against Robertson on One World.

Following the merge, Robertson would go on to win immunity on Day 25. On Night 35, he, Culpepper, and Sarah Lacina successfully blindsided Michaela Bradshaw. On Day 36, Culpepper won immunity and reward, and chose to share the reward with Robertson and Lacina. On the reward, the three agreed to target Tai Trang next. At the Final Six Tribal Council that night, Trang, who was in possession of two idols, played both of them: one on himself and one on Aubry Bracco. Then Lacina played her Legacy Advantage which also granted her immunity, prompting Robertson to "get on the immunity train" and play his idol as well. This left Cirie Fields as the only player left without immunity, thus Fields was eliminated by default.

Ultimately, Robertson made it to the Finals, along with Lacina and Culpepper; but at Final Tribal Council, Robertson was mostly ignored by the jury, who accused him of being Culpepper's follower. But Robertson argued that he had forged personal relationships with everyone, and that he had made quiet moves. In the end, he finished in third place after receiving zero jury votes, losing to Culpepper, who came in second place with three jury votes, and Lacina, who won Sole Survivor with seven votes.

Personal life

Robertson resides in South Florida "on 10 acres of Miami jungle," along with the 12 marmoset monkeys he adopted. "Troyzan," as Robertson is known, is a self-described "jungle boy," saying, "I've lived my life as an adventure, and I'm extremely in touch with nature. I've been a jungle boy my whole life, so fishing, fire-making and shelter-building come very easily to me."

References

External links
 Troy Robertson Photography official website
 Official CBS Survivor biography

1961 births
Living people
Participants in American reality television series
People from Ellensburg, Washington
Sports Illustrated
Survivor (American TV series) contestants
People from Miami-Dade County, Florida